Church of the Ascension of the Lord is a Serbian Orthodox church in the small village of Cetina in Šibenik-Knin County, Croatia. 

Built in 1940 by Marko and Jelena Četnik, the church was destroyed during the Second World War and rebuilt in 1974 when new bells were purchased and a stone fence was erected around the church gate. During the Croatian War of Independence, the church and its inventory was burned down and destroyed by Croatian Armed Forces. 

This church was built modeled on the Temple St. Joachim and Anne at the Studenica Monastery.

See also
Church of Holy Salvation, Cetina
Serbs of Croatia
List of Serbian Orthodox churches in Croatia

References

External links
http://www.eparhija-dalmatinska.hr/Parohija-Cetina-L.htm

Serbian Orthodox church buildings in Croatia
20th-century Serbian Orthodox church buildings
Buildings and structures in Šibenik-Knin County
Destroyed churches in Croatia
Churches completed in 1940
20th-century churches in Croatia